The National Federation of Energy and Gas was a trade union representing workers in the gas, nuclear, and electricity industries in France.

The union was established in 1947, as the National Federation of Trade Unions of the Electric and Gas Industries, under Clément Delsol.  A split from the General Confederation of Labour-aligned National Federation of Energy, it became a founding member of Workers' Force.  By 1995, it claimed 17,250 members.

In 2000, the union merged with the Miners' Federation, to form the National Federation of Energy and Mines.

References

Trade unions established in 1947
Trade unions disestablished in 2000
Trade unions in France
Energy industry trade unions